Alexander Poznansky (born 1950) is a Russian-American scholar of the life and works of Pyotr Ilyich Tchaikovsky.

Born in 1950 at Vyborg. In 1968 he relocated to Leningrad.

Poznansky emigrated from the Soviet Union to the United States in 1977, where he is a Slavic & East European Languages librarian at Yale University. He is perhaps best known for his 1991 book: Tchaikovsky: The Quest for the Inner Man, published by Schirmer/Macmillan.

Books

Tchaikovsky: The Quest for the Inner Man, 1991.
Tchaikovsky's Last Days: A Documentary Study, 1996
Tchaikovsky Through Others' Eyes, 1999
The Tchaikovsky Handbook: A Guide to the Man and His Music: Catalogue of Letters, Genealogy, Bibliography, 2002

References

Living people
Writers from Vyborg
Yale University faculty
Soviet emigrants to the United States
American music historians
American male non-fiction writers
1950 births
20th-century American historians
20th-century American male writers
21st-century American historians
21st-century American male writers
Tchaikovsky scholars